Pitín is a municipality and village in Uherské Hradiště District in the Zlín Region of the Czech Republic. It has about 900 inhabitants.

Notable people
Ondřej Kúdela (born 1987), footballer

References

Villages in Uherské Hradiště District